Rauman Lukko (Finnish for "lock") is a Finnish sports club based in Rauma, Finland, best known for its men’s professional ice hockey team. The club was founded as Rauma Woodin Lukko in 1936. The representative team currently plays in the Finnish Liiga, the premier men’s professional ice hockey league in Finland. They play their home games in the Äijänsuo Arena, which has a capacity of 5,400 spectators. Lukko won the SM-sarja in 1963 and won the Liiga championship in 2021. The club also has a top-tier women’s representative ice hockey team, which plays in the Naisten Liiga, and a top-tier women’s representative pesäpallo team, which plays in the Superpesis.

Honours

Domestic
Liiga
  Winners (1): 2020–21
  Runners-up (1): 1987–88
  3rd place (4): 1993–94, 1995–96, 2010–11, 2013–14

SM-sarja
  Winners (1): 1962–63
  Runners-up (2): 1960–61, 1965–66
  3rd place (2): 1964–65, 1968–69

Other awards for the club:
Harry Lindblad trophy (SM-Liiga regular season winner, since 1975): 2021

Pre-season
Finnish Cup
  Winners (2): 1964, 1969

Players

Current roster

Honored members

4  Teppo Rastio, Jouni Peltonen
7  Matti Keinonen
8  Jorma Vehmanen
13  Jari Torkki
26  Matti Forss
35  Petri Vehanen
77  Erik Hämäläinen

NHL players

  Glenn Anderson
  Sheldon Brookbank
  Hal Gill
  Tuomas Grönman
  Ilkka Heikkinen
  Jarmo Myllys
  Janne Niskala
  Esa Pirnes
  Dwayne Roloson
  Jānis Sprukts
  Iiro Tarkki
  Mikael Tellqvist
  Shayne Toporowski
  Jari Torkki
  Mikkel Bödker
  Frans Nielsen
  Philip Larsen
  Aaron Gagnon
  Petteri Nummelin
  Antti Raanta
  Chris VandeVelde

References

External links
Rauman Lukko official web site 

Liiga teams
Rauma, Finland
1936 establishments in Finland
Liiga 
Sport in Satakunta 
Lukko